Cups was one of several games invented in 1965 by father and son Arthur Amberstone and Wald Amberstone who were both cofounders of the New York Gamers Association (N.Y.G.A.). They also invented Power, and High Deck, a card game based on medieval society. At the time both were working as basket makers as well as game designers in New York City. This game was first published in A Gamut of Games by Sid Sackson in 1969. Wald Amberstone co-founded the Tarot School in 1995 along with his wife Ruth Amberstone. The game Cups is a contemporary two-ranked single-lap member of the ancient game family of Mancala.

Rules

Equipment 

The Cups board is constructed from ten containers: eight small containers called cups and two large containers called pots. In addition to these, 80 beans are needed. Traditionally, the game is played with odds and ends, jars, drinking cups and assorted items serving as the beans.

Setup 
Each player has four cups in front of him and a pot at the end of each row on the farthest right. Each of the player's four cups is aligned adjacent to one of the other player's four cups. Each player receives forty beans as his stock and sits across from the other player.

Play 
 Example Start of Game 

Lower player begins by sowing four beans from his stock left to right.

Higher player sows three beans from his stock right to left and captures a bean.

Lower player sows the bean closest to his pot into his pot.
Players only play on their own four cups. At the beginning of a player's turn the player has the option of doing one of two things.
 The player may remove 1, 2, 3, or 4 beans from his stock and sow them from his leftmost cup (farthest from his pot) towards his pot. Sowing, a term used in Mancala, means to place them in one by one along the line of cups.
 The player may empty one of his cups and sow the contents towards his pot. The player may only do this if the number of beans in the cup is exactly enough to reach the pot. The last bean put into the pot.

Capturing 
If the player chooses option one and the last bean lands in an empty cup a capture may take place. In a capture the opponent's cup adjacent to the formerly empty cup is emptied and placed into the capturing player's pot, unless the opponents cup is empty.

Blocked cups 
A blocked cup is one that contains more beans than would be needed to perform option two, sowing the beans into the pot. Generally, it is unwise to block one's cups because it makes sowing from that cup impossible.

Object 
The object of Cups is to have more beans in one's pot than one's opponent. The game ends when neither player can make a move: a turn is always made if one is possible.

Variation 
This game can also be played with any even number of cups. The cups are arranged in the same manner as above were each cup has one of the opponent's cup adjacent to it and a pot on each end. Ten beans are added to a player's stock for each extra cup he has. For example, if a player has ten cups he would have 100 beans and the board would consist of 22 containers.

References 
 Sackson, Sid. A Gamut of Games. New York: Random House, 1969.

Mancala